Kamel Hassan Maghur (1 January 1935 – 5 January 2002) was a Libyan lawyer, diplomat, and writer. He also held various cabinet posts.

Biography
Maghur was born in Dahra, Tripoli, Italian Libya in 1935. He became a lawyer and subsequently a judge in Libya after completing law school in Cairo. He served in various diplomatic and international legal postings, including service as Libya's ambassador to the United Nations, Canada, France and China. In 1972 he became minister for petroleum and in 1984 served as OPEC's chief. In 1986–1987, he was Libya's minister for foreign affairs and in 1989 returned to private law practice in Tripoli. In the late 1990s he served as Libya's lawyer handling sanctions and charges associated with the Lockerbie bombing.

Maghur published eight books of short stories between the 1950s and 2000. He and his wife Suhir Elgheryani had seven children.

References

External links
 

20th-century novelists
20th-century Libyan writers
20th-century lawyers
1935 births
2002 deaths
Libyan judges
Libyan novelists
Libyan Arab Socialist Union politicians
Foreign ministers of Libya
Oil ministers of Libya
Secretaries General of OPEC
Permanent Representatives of Libya to the United Nations
Ambassadors of Libya to Canada
Ambassadors of Libya to China
Ambassadors of Libya to France